is a Japanese professional Go player.

Biography
Akiyama became a professional in 1992 at the age of 14. He was taught by Yasuro Kikuchi. In 1999, he was promoted to 7 dan. His biggest accomplishment came in 2002 when he was runner-up for the NEC Shun-Ei title to Shinji Takao. He currently resides in Tokyo, Japan.

Promotion record

Past runners-up

References

1977 births
Living people
Japanese Go players
Asian Games medalists in go
Go players at the 2010 Asian Games
Asian Games bronze medalists for Japan
Medalists at the 2010 Asian Games